Hematite is the mineral form of iron oxide. 

Hematite may also refer to:

 Hematite, Missouri, United States
 Hematite, Virginia, United States
 Hematite, Wisconsin, United States
 Hematite Township, Michigan, United States
Hematites, a genus of belemnite